

References

Nuclear technology-related lists
History-related lists